St. Paul's Co-educational College, (often abbreviated as St. Paul's, St. Paul's Co-ed., Co-ed. or SPCC) is an Anglican secondary school located at 33 MacDonnell Road, Mid-Levels, Hong Kong. Founded in 1915, it was a girls-only college until after World War II. The college offers the HKDSE and IBDP curricula in parallel. It is the first Round Square school in greater China. Since 2001, it has been under the Direct Subsidy Scheme. It has an affiliated primary school, making it a school of the "through-train" system.

History

The college was founded in 1915 as St. Paul's Girls' College (聖保羅女書院) by the Anglican church.  The school's motto is Faith, Hope and Love, derived from the Bible, 1 Corinthians 13. In 1918, the College was the first school in Hong Kong to require students to wear a school uniform.  

In 1927, the College was moved to 33 MacDonnell Road, and became the site of the school since then.

In 1932, the College adopted the school badge that is still used now.

In 1945, the College resumed operation while St. Paul's Boys' College moved in. Since then, the College began to accept both boys and girls, and became the first co-educational school in Hong Kong. As the College transformed from a girls school to a co-educational school, a whole-day primary school was established. Mr Maak Ying Kei was appointed as the Headteacher of the primary school.

When St. Paul's Boys' College moved back to their campus in Bonham Road in 1950, the school continued to accept both boys and girls, remaining co-educational. Before the primary school changed into an AM and PM school in 1957, it moved to 1 Calder Path. The position of Headteacher in the PM primary school was taken up by Ms Fok Lan Hing. In 1959, the new west wing of the College was completed as part of the secondary school.

Exam results 
St. Paul's Co-educational College has produced 13 perfect scorers "10As" in the history of Hong Kong Certificate of Education Examination (HKCEE) and 15 "Top Scorers" and "Super Top Scorers" in the history of Hong Kong Diploma of Secondary Education Examination (HKDSE).

7 x 5** "Top Scorers" are candidates who obtained perfect scores of 5** in each of the four core subjects and three electives.

8 x 5** "Super Top Scorers" are candidates who obtained seven Level 5** in four core subjects and three electives, and an additional Level 5** in the Mathematics Extended (M1/M2) module.

Notable alumni

Academics
 Lawrence J. Lau – former Vice-Chancellor of The Chinese University of Hong Kong; former member of the Executive Council of Hong Kong
 Arthur Li – member of the Executive Council of Hong Kong; member of the Council of the University of Hong Kong; former Secretary for Education and Manpower of Hong Kong; former Vice-Chancellor of The Chinese University of Hong Kong
 Chung-Kwong Poon – former President of the Hong Kong Polytechnic University
 Kenneth Young – Theoretical physicist; Professor of Physics and former Pro-Vice-Chancellor of the Chinese University of Hong Kong

Public services / professionals
 Vivienne Poy – the first Senator of Canada of Asian descent; former Chancellor of the University of Toronto (the first of Chinese descent)
 Rebecca Chan – Decorated U.S. World War II veteran who served as a Nurse with the Flying Tigers (China), the U.S. Army (China) and the China National Aviation Corporation (China and India), with work including flying over the Hump (1942-1948); the first Head (Sister-Tutor-in-Charge) of the Nursing School of the Tung Wah Group of Hospitals, Hong Kong, 1964-1975; 1933 graduate of St. Paul's Girls School (the forerunner of St. Paul's Co-educational College)
 Andrew Li – former Chief Justice of the Court of Final Appeal of Hong Kong; Also Vice Chairman of the School Council
 Audrey Eu – former member of the Legislative Council of Hong Kong, party leader of the Hong Kong Civic Party, former Chairperson of the Hong Kong Bar Association
 Marvin Cheung – member of the Executive Council of Hong Kong, Chairman of the Council of the Hong Kong University of Science and Technology, Chairman of the Airport Authority Hong Kong
 Moses Cheng – Chairman of the Hong Kong Education Commission, former Chairman of the Council and Court of the Hong Kong Baptist University, former member of the Legislative Council of Hong Kong
 Selina Chow – former member of the Executive Council of Hong Kong and Legislative Council of Hong Kong
 Priscilla Leung – Kowloon City District Councilor (Elected)
 Maria Tam – former member of the Executive Council of Hong Kong and Legislative Council of Hong Kong
 Eric Li – former member of the Legislative Council of Hong Kong, former President of the Hong Kong Society of Accountants

Business
 Johnny Hon – Venture capitalist
 Victor Li – Managing Director of Cheung Kong (Holdings) Limited; elder son of multibillionaire Li Ka-Shing
 Richard Li – Chairman of PCCW; younger son of multibillionaire Li Ka-Shing
 Ronnie Chan – Chairman of Hang Lung Properties
 Adrian Cheng – CEO of New World Development; grandson of multibillionaire Cheng Yu-tung

Musicians
 Warren Lee – Artist, concert pianist; Music Director of St. Paul's Co-educational College
 Kenneth Chan – Actor
 Rick Astley – Songwriter, world-renowned singer 
 Danny Chan – The late singer
 Michael Kwan – Singer
 Justin Lo – Singer-songwriter
 Samuel Wong – Conductor
 Mark Lui – Songwriter
 Eugene Pao – Jazz guitarist

Others
 Sham Yen Yi – 2014 Miss Earth China

See also
 Education in Hong Kong
 Lists of schools in Hong Kong
 Robert Kotewall

References

External links

SPCC Official Website
SPCC Alumni Association
Antiquities Advisory Board. Historic Building Appraisal. School building of 1927, St Paul's Co-educational College, No. 33 MacDonnell Road Picture
 Antiquities and Monuments Office. Heritage Impact Assessment Report. Redevelopment of St. Paul's Co-educational College (Phase 2), February 2011
 Antiquities and Monuments Office. Central and Western Heritage Trail. St. Paul's Co-educational College

Central, Hong Kong
Educational institutions established in 1915
Protestant secondary schools in Hong Kong
Anglican schools in Hong Kong
Grade II historic buildings in Hong Kong
International Baccalaureate schools in Hong Kong
Round Square schools
Hong Kong Sheng Kung Hui
Through Train schools
1915 establishments in Hong Kong